Daniel Aleksandrov may refer to:
 Daniel of Erie (1930–2010), American Russian Orthodox bishop
 Daniel Aleksandrov (wrestler) (born 1991), Bulgarian Greco-Roman wrestler